The Southern Nilotic languages are spoken mainly in western Kenya and northern Tanzania (with one of them, Kupsabiny or Sapiny, being spoken on the Ugandan side of Mount Elgon). They form a division of the larger Nilotic language family, along with the Western Nilotic languages and the Eastern Nilotic languages.

Subdivisions 
The Southern Nilotic languages are generally divided into two groups, Kalenjin and Tatogoa, although there is some uncertainty as to the internal coherence of the Kalenjin branch. Southern Nilotic languages appear to have been influenced considerably by Cushitic (Afro-Asiatic) languages. The Kalenjin languages are spoken by the Kalenjin people. This family spreads all around Uganda and to some of Kenya. The Tatoga languages consist of the Omotik language and of the larger Datooga language, or more fitting, Datooga dialect cluster.

Kalenjin (see)
Tatoga: Omotik, Datooga

Languages 
 Datooga
 Omotik
 Kupsabiny
 Sabaot
 Okiek
 Kipsigis

Reconstruction
Proto-Kalenjin has been reconstructed by Franz Rottland (1979).

Cushitic influences
Historically, Southern Nilotic has undergone extensive contact with a "missing" branch of East Cushitic that Heine (1979) refers to as Baz. Proto-Baz reconstructions proposed by Heine (1979):

See also 
 Languages of Kenya
 Languages of Tanzania
 Languages of Uganda
 Serengeti-Dorobo language, of which at least the numeral system is Southern or Eastern Nilotic
 List of Proto-Southern Nilotic reconstructions (Wiktionary)

References